The 80th Clifford Cup tournament was held between the 20 and 29 March 2015.

Seedings
The seeding is based upon the teams standings at the end of the 2014-15 Dialog Rugby League season. Last year's cup holder, Navy SC, even though they won twelve matches narrowly lost the league by percentage to Kandy SC, who won eleven games. As Colombo Hockey and Football Club and the Hambantota Sharks both withdrew from the league competition midway through the season the second-round games were played only between seven teams. Kandy SC having the top seeding were awarded a first round bye in the Cup competition.

 Kandy SC
 Navy SC
 Havelock SC
 Ceylonese R & FC
 Army SC
 Police SC
 Air Force SC

Quarter finals

Semi finals

Final

References

2015
2015 rugby union tournaments for clubs
2015 in Asian rugby union
2015 in Sri Lankan sport